Wilcza (lit. Wolf Street) is a street in Warsaw's city centre. It links Koszykowa Street in the south-eastern part of the borough with the Three Crosses Square at the Royal Route. Initially, at least since 14th century, the street was just a road running along by the fields belonging to the vogts of old Warsaw, much to the south of the city's limits.

As the family of Wilk (Polish word for wolf) dominated the office of the city's vogt throughout the 15th century, the road started to be referred to by their name, initially in the form of Wilcze or Na Wilczem (Wilks' or At the Wilks, respectively). With time the real etymology became obscure and the name started to be associated with the literal meaning of the surname rather than the surname itself. In 1770 the name was  officially approved by the Naming Commission.

References

Streets in Warsaw